Sound of... is an annual BBC poll of music critics and industry figures to find the most promising new music talent. It was first conducted by the BBC News website in 2003, and is now widely covered by the corporation's online, radio and TV outlets, as well as other media. A 10-strong longlist is published each December, with a ranked shortlist and annual winner announced the following January.

Winners

2000s

2010s

2020s

Notes

Sound of 2009
More than 130 critics, editors and broadcasters took part in the Sound of 2009 survey, which was won by electro-pop singer Little Boots. For the first time, a longlist of 15 acts from the 2009 poll was published by the BBC on 5 December 2008. The other five acts on the longlist were Frankmusik, Master Shortie, Mumford & Sons, The Big Pink and The Temper Trap.

Sound of 2010
The longlist for the Sound of 2010 poll was revealed on 7 December 2009. The acts nominated were Daisy Dares You, Delphic, Devlin, Ellie Goulding, Everything Everything, Giggs, Gold Panda, Hurts, Joy Orbison, Marina and the Diamonds, Owl City, Rox, Stornoway, The Drums and Two Door Cinema Club. On 8 January 2010, Ellie Goulding was announced as the winner. She has since gone to reach No. 1 with her debut album Lights.

Sound of 2011
The longlist for the Sound of 2011 poll was revealed on 6 December 2010. The acts nominated were Anna Calvi, Clare Maguire, Daley, Esben and the Witch, Jai Paul, James Blake, Jamie Woon, Jessie J, MONA, NERO, The Naked and Famous, The Vaccines, Warpaint, Wretch 32 and Yuck. On 7 January 2011, Jessie J was announced as the winner.

Sound of 2012
The longlist for the Sound of 2012 poll was revealed on 5 December 2011. The acts nominated were ASAP Rocky, Azealia Banks, Dot Rotten, Dry The River, Flux Pavilion, Frank Ocean, Friends, Jamie N Commons, Lianne La Havas, Michael Kiwanuka, Niki & The Dove, Ren Harvieu, Skrillex, Spector and Stooshe. On 6 January 2012, Michael Kiwanuka was announced as the winner.

Sound of 2013
The longlist for the Sound of 2013 poll was revealed on 9 December 2012. The acts nominated were AlunaGeorge, A*M*E, Angel Haze, Arlissa, CHVRCHΞS, HAIM, King Krule, Kodaline, Laura Mvula, Little Green Cars, Palma Violets, Peace, Savages, the Weeknd and Tom Odell. On 4 January 2013, HAIM were announced as the winners on Radio 1 by Huw Stephens.

Sound of 2014
The longlist for the Sound of 2014 poll was revealed on 2 December 2013. The acts nominated were Banks, Chance the Rapper, Chlöe Howl, Ella Eyre, George Ezra, FKA twigs, Jungle, Kelela, Luke Sital-Singh, MNEK, Nick Mulvey, Royal Blood, Sam Smith, Sampha and Say Lou Lou. On 10 January 2014, Sam Smith was announced as the winner on Radio 1 by Nick Grimshaw.

Sound of 2015
The longlist for the Sound of 2015 poll was revealed on 1 December 2014. The acts nominated were George the Poet, James Bay, Kwabs, Låpsley, Novelist, Rae Morris, Raury, Shamir, Shura, Slaves, SOAK, Stormzy, Sunset Sons, Wolf Alice and Years & Years. On 9 January 2015, Years & Years were announced as the winners on Radio 1 by Huw Stephens.

Sound of 2016
The longlist for the Sound of 2016 poll was revealed on 30 November 2015. The acts nominated were Alessia Cara, Billie Marten, Blossoms, Dua Lipa, Frances, Izzy Bizu, Jack Garratt, J Hus, Loyle Carner, Mabel, Mura Masa, NAO, RAT BOY, Section Boyz and WSTRN. On 8 January 2016, Jack Garratt was announced as the winner.

Sound of 2017
The longlist for the Sound of 2017 poll was revealed on 28 November 2016. The acts nominated were AJ Tracey, Anderson .Paak, CABBAGE, Dave, Declan McKenna, Jorja Smith, Maggie Rogers, Nadia Rose, Rag'n'Bone Man, Ray BLK, RAYE, Stefflon Don, The Amazons, The Japanese House and Tom Grennan. On 6 January 2017, Ray BLK was announced as the winner on Radio 1 by Clara Amfo.

Sound of 2018
The longlist for the Sound of 2018 was revealed on 27 November 2017. The acts nominated were ALMA, Billie Eilish, IAMDDB, Jade Bird, Khalid, Lewis Capaldi, Nilüfer Yanya, Not3s, Pale Waves, Rex Orange County, Sam Fender, Sigrid, Superorganism, Tom Walker, yaeji and Yxng Bane. On 12 January 2018, Sigrid was announced as the winner on Radio 1 by Clara Amfo.

Sound of 2019
The longlist for the Sound of 2019 was revealed on 10 December 2018. The acts nominated were Dermot Kennedy, Ella Mai, FLOHIO, Grace Carter, King Princess, Mahalia, Octavian, ROSALÍA, Sea Girls and slowthai. This is the first longlist since the Sound of 2007 to feature only 10 acts. On 11 January 2019, Octavian was announced as the winner by Annie Mac, making him the first rapper since 50 Cent in 2003 to win the longlist. He was also the first winner since 2009 to be signed not with Universal Music Group, with which all winners of Sound of... since 2010 were signed at the time of awarding - Octavian is signed with Black Butter, which is partially owned by Universal's competitor, Sony Music.

Sound of 2020
The longlist for the Sound of 2020 was revealed on 12 December 2019. The acts nominated were Arlo Parks, beabadoobee, Celeste, easy life, Georgia, Inhaler, Joesef, Joy Crookes, Squid and YUNGBLUD. On 9 January 2020, Celeste was announced as the winner.

Sound of 2021
The longlist for the Sound of 2021 was revealed on 7 December 2020. The acts nominated were Alfie Templeman, BERWYN, Bree Runway, Dutchavelli, girl in red, Greentea Peng, Griff, Holly Humberstone, Pa Salieu and The Lathums. On 7 January 2021, Pa Salieu was announced as the winner on Radio 1 by Annie Mac.

Sound of 2022
The longlist for the Sound of 2022 was revealed on 6 December 2021. The acts nominated were Baby Queen, Central Cee, ENNY, Lola Young, Mimi Webb, PinkPantheress, Priya Ragu, Tems, Wet Leg, and Yard Act. On 6 January 2022, PinkPantheress was announced as the winner by Jack Saunders.

Sound of 2023
The longlist for the Sound of 2023 was revealed on 5 December 2022. The acts nominated were Asake, Biig Piig, Cat Burns, DYLAN, FLO, Fred again.., Gabriels, Nia Archives, piri & tommy and Rachel Chinouriri. On 5 January 2023, FLO were announced as the winners by Stormzy and Jack Saunders, making them the first female group to win the award since it was first presented in 2003.

Criticism
It has been commented upon that the Sound of... survey, together with other polls, creates a self-fulfilling prophecy. Mainly because the BBC has a significant amount of control on who becomes a "breakthrough act", via their television and radio channels.

Guardian critic Kitty Empire wrote in December 2007: "Many of us are editors commissioning, and journalists writing, our own ones-to-watch forecasts. In order not to look like idiots, we tend to tip acts with records coming out rather than some lad with a tin whistle we found on MySpace."

The same issue was again raised in 2011, upon the publication of the longlist for the Sound of 2012. The Daily Telegraph's Joe Burgis wrote "the Sound of 2012 project faces criticism that it is too heavily weighted in favour of mainstream performers."

The head of music at BBC Radio 1 and 1Xtra response to the question was "The list will inspire debate for sure, but most importantly, it will lead to discovery of artists and musicians trying to stand out from the ever-expanding crowd, and that can only be a good thing".

References

External links

BBC music awards
BBC New Media
Sound of...
Awards established in 2003
2003 establishments in the United Kingdom